John W. Ferguson House was located in Paterson, Passaic County, New Jersey. The house was built in 1906 and was added to the National Register of Historic Places on May 23, 1980. The house was demolished in September 1988.

See also
National Register of Historic Places listings in Passaic County, New Jersey

References

External links
 Google Street View of the former location of the John W. Ferguson House

Buildings and structures demolished in 1988
Buildings and structures in Paterson, New Jersey
Houses on the National Register of Historic Places in New Jersey
Houses completed in 1906
Houses in Passaic County, New Jersey
National Register of Historic Places in Passaic County, New Jersey
New Jersey Register of Historic Places
1906 establishments in New Jersey
Demolished buildings and structures in New Jersey
Former National Register of Historic Places in New Jersey